Metacrinus zonatus is a sea lily from the Isselicrinidae family.

The scientific name of the species was published in 1908 by Austin Hobart Clark.

References 

Isselicrinidae
Animals described in 1908
Taxa named by Austin Hobart Clark